The fashions of the 2020s represent a departure from 2010s fashion. They have been largely inspired by styles of the early to mid-2000s, late 1990s, 1980s, 1970s, and 1960s. Popular brands in the United Kingdom, United States, and Australia during this era include Adidas, Nike, New Balance, Globe International, Vans, Kappa, Tommy Hilfiger, Asics, Ellesse, Ralph Lauren, Forever 21, Playboy, and The North Face.

During the 2020s, many companies, including current fashion giants such as Shein and Shekou, have been using social media platforms such as TikTok and Instagram as a marketing tool. Marketing strategies involving third parties, particularly influencers and celebrities, have become prominent promotional tactics. E-commerce platforms such as Depop and Etsy grew by offering vintage, homemade, or resold clothing from individual sellers. Their goal is to promote and support small businesses and the environment instead of major retailers. Thrifting has become a significant success in the fashion industry of the 2020s as it happens to be centered around finding valuable or staple pieces of clothing at a reasonable price.

General trends

COVID-19 pandemic

The COVID-19 pandemic influenced many aspects of society, including fashion. Wearing a face mask has become a common and often mandatory practice. The mask shortage, human desire for self-expression, and the ability to quickly design and make masks without specialized technology soon led to a multitude of mask designs. In addition, fashion's ability to adapt to the dynamics of the world allowed fashion to stay one step ahead of the changes.

In response to these changes, fashion emerged that prioritized comfort, style, and safety. Both men and women favored more comfortable everyday wear along with face masks. This included sneakers, loungewear, athleisure, pajamas, and zoom tops. Zoom tops were shirts that were kept close by so the wearer could easily be presentable for a video meeting.

Maximalism and 2010s backlash
Maximalist style made a comeback in America as the decade began, as a backlash against the fashions of the 2010s. After two years indoors, many younger people started to channel their restless energy into cheery, upbeat fashions. Gen Z found themselves dissatisfied with Minimalism and Millennial fashion, considering it lacked in self-expression and fluid gender representation. All facets of popular culture were impacted by maximalism, especially fashion, interior design, music, and the arts. The remnants of minimalist fashion were rebranded as fashion subcultures such as Postminimalism and Normcore.

Although they were a fashion must-have in the 2010s, skinny jeans faced a significant backlash at the start of the decade. Gen-Z social media influencers on TikTok and BeReal decided that skinny jeans were no longer a symbol of youth culture, which caused controversy among fashion bloggers and millennial women. Separating one's hair to the side (side-part) was considered to be out of style by Gen-Z influencers. The term cheugy was coined to describe "tacky millennial fashion".

Return of anti-fashion 
From 2022 onward, anti-fashion made a comeback among many users of social media like TikTok in reaction to the proliferation of short-lived high fashion trend cycles after the Covid lockdowns of the early 2020s. Many young people in America, Europe, and Australia combined vintage pieces with high street purchases and fast fashion bought from websites like Shein because it was nearly impossible to keep up with the wide variety of styles being shown to the average social media user daily, and also because mainstream fashion media quickly became outdated as new fads emerged online.   Nostalgia rivals and niche subcultures became the most popular way of consuming mainstream fashion, giving the impression that everything was trendy at the same time.

Women's clothing

Early 2020s (2020–2022)

2000s revival

As the decade began, fashions of the late 1990s and early to mid-2000s made a comeback, as many younger women in the UK, Australia, the US, Europe, and Asia rejected the form-fitting clothes that were a staple of 2010s fashion. In late 2020, younger British and American women abandoned skinny jeans for sweatpants; sweat suits; leggings; bike shorts; baggy shorts; mom jeans; low rise pants; overalls; shortalls; pants with drawstring waists; studded belts; zip up denim jumpsuits with large pockets; boot cut pants and leggings; pink velour tracksuits; leather skirts; ankle length skirts sometimes made from sheer fabric; baggy pants; and culottes.

From 2020 to 2022, desirable colors in the US and Europe included navy blue, neon green, electric blue, purple, black, white, coral, baby pink, light grey, silver, pastel pink, violet, pale blue, lavender, mint green, faded yellow, pastel teal, lemon yellow, orange, red, and brown.

Popular shirts, coats, and dresses from this time included puffer jackets made from upcycled deadstock fabric, sweatshirts, high waisted pants, tucked-in sweaters, camisoles and crop tops, lowrise miniskirts, brocade topcoats, midriff-baring tops, ribbed turtlenecks, garish Ed Hardy style T-shirts with rhinestones, off-the-shoulder knitted tops, science fiction-inspired metallic jackets, loose-fitting shift dresses  or blouses, pantywaist tops sometimes with cap sleeves, cashmere cardigans, and oversized 1980s-inspired dog's tooth check jackets popularized by Kaia Gerber and Miley Cyrus.

Shoe and accessory styles changed as Crocs, platform sandals, knee-high boots, ballet flats, white sneakers (such as Vans, Keds, Nike Air Force 1s, or Converse), fringed handbags, multi-coloured 1980s-inspired earrings made from recycled ocean plastic, white bralettes, chunky cable knit scarves, Chelsea boots, and Doc Martens became popular.

These women shifted to fair trade, vintage, and cruelty-free clothing. Fashion-conscious British women rejected nylon, acrylic, rayon, new cotton, and polyester in favor of tencel, linen, organic cotton, and recycled polyester. Workplace dress codes became more casual due to a higher proportion of remote workers among white collar staff. Many professional women, especially in the UK and America, paired a formal blouse with casual leg wear like shorts or even pajama bottoms on video conferences.

In India, Pakistan, and Ceylon, Generation Z girls repurposed the sari worn by their mothers. They paired it with sneakers, casual knitwear, crop tops, T-shirts, black Oxford shoes, Y2K-inspired platform sandals, and sportswear. The dresses were often made in contrasting shades of grey, black, and blush pink seen as a sleek, modern, and corporate look.

1960s influences

The spring of 2021 saw a revival of psychedelic mid-to-late 1960s fashion in the UK, Asia, the US, and Africa. Clothing such as miniskirts, slim fit capri pants, denim jumpsuits, flared trousers, patched jeans, dog's tooth check skirts and mini-dresses, and cropped slim jeans were popular pants among younger women.

Other favoured styles included prairie dresses with floral embroidery; backless sundresses; floor-length kaftans with jeans; Pendleton jackets; hippie style mood rings popularized by Lorde; tiered flamenco dresses that flare out below the knee; satin slip dresses; jumpers with smiley faces and mushroom designs; satin blouses; checkerboard sweater vests; leather three-quarter length coats; Crombie style wool overcoats; leopard print winter coats; zip collar turtleneck sweaters; zip-up polo shirts with white collar trim; clothing with sunflower print; checkerboard motifs; and diamond and hexagonal prints. Popular colors during this time included brown, sage green, royal blue, hot pink, orange, yellow, and purple.

Cottage-core
During the COVID-19 pandemic lockdowns in early 2020, cottage-core became popular due to many younger women's desire to escape cities for rural life. Cottagecore fashion became popular in Korea, the US, and the UK, promoted by social media sites such as TikTok, Pinterest, and Tumblr. From 2020 to 2022, Western artists such as Taylor Swift adopted the trend.

The Cottagecore style was defined by pastel colors and palettes that evoked a romantic, idealized country aesthetic. American news website Vox characterized cottagecore popularity as "an escapist trend where quarantines were romantic instead of terrifying". Cottagecore centres around coloured and colours. Popular clothing included prairie dresses, blue gingham mini-dresses, white gypsy tops with multicolour Mexican-inspired floral embroidery, and hippie-style maxi dresses inspired by those worn during the late 1960s. Gingham and Austerity-era floral patterns dominated the aesthetic.

Coastal Grandmother
A closely related fashion trend, popularized by TikTok influencer Lex Nicoleta during the summer of 2022, was known as "Coastal Grandmother". The term was originally coined to describe a “beachy, romantic aesthetic" associated with the rural American East Coast. It combined elements of cottage-core with spring and fall beachwear previously associated with baby boomers like Diane Keaton, especially white jeans, cashmere turtleneck sweaters, pastel pink flip-flops, woven tote bags made from recycled fabric, straw beekeeper style sun hats, and oversized linen blouses.

Mid 2020s (2023–present)

Men's clothing

Early 2020s (2020–2022)

2000s influences

As Gen Z reached adulthood, fashions of the late 90s and early to mid-2000s returned. This included mixing carefully selected contemporary fashion brands like Ellesse, Kappa, Tommy Hilfiger, or Ralph Lauren with original vintage clothing and recent thrift shop finds.

Popular trends in the UK, Italy, Sweden, China, the US, and Australia included black or white crew neck shirts designed by Carhartt, Ralph Lauren, Calvin Klein, or Hanes, midnight blue U.S. Woodland camouflage baseball caps, straight leg jeans like the Levi Strauss 501 instead of the skinny jeans popular in the 2010s, T-shirts with geek chic-inspired game console logos like the Sony PlayStation, bold multicolour motif shirts popularized by DJ Khaled, tracksuits with business suit styling, gorpcore — (after the colloquial term for trail mix — "Good ol' Raisins and Peanuts") — hiking and fishing clothing like Fjallraven windbreakers or cargo pants, Sandqvist canvas rucksacks, jogger pants as athletic style, twill joggers as a more dressed up style, black trench coats  and leather reefer jackets reminiscent of those worn in The Matrix, imitation leather messenger bags featuring throwback logos, Fred Perry Oxford shirts with vertical stripes, and club wear — especially brightly patterned camp shirts. Other popular items are workwear like fleece jackets, zip-up hoodies, unbranded baseball caps, rubber pool sliders and flip-flops especially in contrasting shades like purple and white, corduroy pants, trucker caps, brightly colored hoodies with bold designer logos like Polo Ralph Lauren, Champion Sportswear or Super Dry, and slim-fitting grey or khaki cargo pants worn with matching lightweight M65 Field Jackets with multiple external patch pockets.

Other 2000s retreads included old school hip-hop-inspired satin track jackets, athletic tank tops with contrasting black, orange and magenta stripes, wide-leg jeans, Burberry motifs, neon yellow and bright turquoise Lululemon socks, 59Fiftycap, bandannas, bucket hats, sports jerseys, cargo pants, bomber jackets, preppy Madras plaid shirts and Henley shirts, blouson style leather jackets, long sleeve knitted polo shirts, red, yellow and green bucket hats (especially among Welsh soccer fans during the 2022 Fifa World Cup), silk skinny ties with bold prints, tapered high waisted pants known as "dad jeans" in the US, brow line sunglasses, pleated khaki chino pants, mid-washed slim-fitting jeans and jean jackets, tie dye socks, oversized sweaters, pale denim bleached almost white, paisley sweatpants, looser fitting stonewashed jeans, sleeveless undershirts, Nike Shorts, swim shorts, white polo shirts, mid-wash double denim, oversized Bermuda shorts, colour block hoodies and sweatpants with a stripe down the leg, parkas, duffle coats, paint-spattered T-shirts, over shirts made from blanket cloth, retro bowling shirts, yellow and blue striped Rugby shirts, and distressed Perfecto motorcycle jackets. Oversized gold chains regained popularity.

Common footwear included classic Air Jordan sneakers, loafers with chunky brothel creeper soles favoured by Shawn Mendes, suede desert boots, cyan floral print Vans sneakers popularized by Nick of the Jonas Brothers, all-black imitation leather Adidas trainers, suede Timberland boots, Gucci loafers, Lacrosse or Sorel duck boots, suede Beatle boots chunky hiking sandals, high top Converse All-Stars, Nike Air Max sneakers, worker boots, and combat boots bought as army surplus.

Desirable colours included white; orange; brown; black; yellow; greens, such as olive and lime; blues, such as indigo, sky, cyan, and navy; and tans, such as khaki and taupe.

As a result of the increase in remote work, workplace dress codes became more casual Employees returning to the office frequently combined the 1990s business casual attire with elements of loungewear and athleisure such as black monotone sneakers, navy hoodies, shorts, and even dark grey sweatpants.

Due to the many gym closures, digital smart watches with timers replaced analog wristwatches as many younger men in Europe and America subscribed to online apps for tracking and planning their exercise routines at home. In the UK, Middle East, and some parts of Africa, keffiyehs were used in an attempt to block viruses and to show support for Palestinian nationalism.

1980s revival

Due to many 2000s fashions being throwbacks to the late 1970s to early 1980s, clothing such as pinstripes, textured knits with vertical stripes, leather waistcoats, clothing with corduroy texture, navy blue and emerald green power suits with shoulder pads, pleated trousers, and Chelsea boots regained popularity. The increased formality for men returning to the office was, in part, a reaction to the ubiquitous casual wear associated with working from home during the coronavirus lockdowns of 2020-21.

In Britain and the US, clothing with sports logos, colour block, Harrington jackets, baseball jackets, stonewashed denim jackets, and red or green plaid trucker-style jackets with sheepskin lining, aviator sunglasses, brown shearling flight jackets, plaid suits, striped full-button cardigan sweaters with polo shirt collars, white Converse All-Star or throwback Adidas sneakers, tan gabardine trenchcoats reminiscent of those worn by 80s TV detective Columbo, preppy style aran sweaters and fairisle cardigan sweaters with shawl collars, safari suits intended for the modern business casual workplace, double-breasted 1940s style blazers originally revived in the 1980s as the power suit,  camp collar shirts with bold prints or stripes, corduroy sports coats, Ivy League college-style cardigans with trim, jacquard, dog's tooth, and cashmere check wool scarves, tricolour socks, Vans, monotone Plimsoll shoes, towelling polo shirts, turtlenecks, and t-shirts featuring vintage-inspired graphics such as muscle cars, comic book characters, and brands such as Coca-Cola, regained mainstream popularity.

Colours such as green, grey, navy blue, red, black, white, forest green, and orange became popular in 2021. Other desired articles of clothing included stylized pale blue and magenta representations of palm trees or cassette players, and 1980s movie posters such as Star Wars or the Ghostbusters logo due to the unexpected popularity of the 2021 movie.

Work-wear in Street fashion

Since the late 1990s, functional workwear items like Dickies trousers and Barbour jackets have been fashion statements, first sold through independent menswear stores like American Classics in London and Oi Polloi in Manchester. Workwear were as common on the high street as it is in department stores, with many fast-fashion labels even offering capsule collections of blue-collar staples like chore jackets and Selvage denim jeans. Brands such as Carhartt, Dickies and Uniqlo saw success throughout the beginning of the decade thanks to their close association with hip-hop streetwear and skate culture. Crewneck T shirts especially in white or black, green or navy blue overshirts, dress socks, safety boots resembling sneakers, black or khaki Dickies 874 pants, and folded knit caps became wardrobe essentials during this period.

Gender neutral clothing

Genderless fashion is a global movement with deep ties with women's and LGBTQ liberation. Originally a niche subculture, it went mainstream in America, Korea and the UK by 2021, with fashion experts speculating that the emerging androgynous style represents a new ideal of male beauty. The style took inspiration from 1980s fashion, anime, trendsetters like Ryuchell, and the often androgynous style of K-pop boy bands. Dyed hair, makeup, short shorts, knee socks, necklaces, tight pants, brothel creepers, Pink Panther and Betty Boop motifs, and feminine blouses in leopard print, silver, or bright colours like pink and orange were particularly common.

Men on the red carpet were also embracing accessories like feather boas and pearl jewelry. Other popular articles of clothing included kimono style shirts, frilly lace blouses, tunics, boots with stacked Cuban heels, crop tops, furry ugg boots, kilts, mint green safari jackets with Nudie Cohn inspired embroidery, shiny jackets with shoulder pads and puffy sleeves, flared trousers, transparent shirts, shawl lapel sports coats sometimes covered with sequins or rhinestones, oversized silk shirts in purple, green, gold or silver, and suits in eccentric colours like gold lame, shiny green sequins, or fuchsia.

During the summer of 2022, Gen Z men in America favored shorter athletic shorts, sometimes referred to as "hoochie daddy shorts", with a 5-inch or even a 3-inch inseam. Several factors contributed to the rise in popularity of 5-inch shorts, including the popularity of men's thighs on social media, a greater acceptance of gender-fluid clothing in mainstream fashion, and general comfort and fashion trends.

Originally athletic wear, jock straps were worn as underwear by many gay men during the early 2020s. By 2022, some straight Gen Z men in America were buying them either as an ironic gag gift or as fetish wear for the bedroom.

The leading trendsetters in androgynous fashion during this time included Harry Styles, Italian shock rock group Maneskin, actor Timothée Chalamet, Bad Bunny, Lil Nas X, Billy Porter, Brad Pitt, Paul Mescal, African entrepreneur Ezra Olubi, and Jimin. Due to the influence of artists like Ru Paul, Jodie Harsh and gay singer Sam Smith, drag queen-inspired outfits went mainstream. Influential designers included Harris Reed, JW Anderson, and Bode.

Mid 2020s (2023–present)

Youth fashion

E-kids, Punk, Emo, and Scene core

The widespread internet and social media access at the beginning of 2020 caused a boom in the popularity of 2000s subcultures and fashion styles among teenagers. One such subculture was the alternative or pop-punk style of the early 2000s. This style was trendy among scene kids, punks, emos, skaters, and mall goths who referred to them as the "Rawring Twenties" on social media. Youth wanted to fully recreate the 'peak' of emo culture in every aspect of their lifestyle. This phenomenon increased secondhand shopping, allowing people to find genuine or deadstock items from the early 2000s. Reasons for subculture revivals are nostalgia and considered that fashion to be liberating, and eye-catching.

E-kid culture of the early 2020s was influenced by 2000s-inspired pop punk and emo aesthetics. Celebrities and influencers such as Billie Eilish, Yungblud, Dua Lipa, Lil Peep, Bladee, and Juice WRLD based their styles on emo rap, dark trap, ragecore, digicore, and industrial trap music. The pop punk revival of the early 2020s, associated with acts like Machine Gun Kelly, Olivia Rodrigo and Yungblud, as well as 2000s groups like Paramore releasing comeback albums, had a significant E-kid fanbase.

Like the millennial scene kids swapping style tips on MySpace during the mid to late 2000s, Generation Z used YouTube and TikTok to showcase their coloured bang haircuts, customized androgynous all-black outfits, low-rise pants, stripy T-shirts, silver jewelry, mesh tops, plaid or leather miniskirts, platform sneakers, knit caps, band T-shirts, garishly printed shirts, hoodies, fishnets, wallet chains, and pale emo-inspired makeup with blush and heavy eyeliner. Despite the criticism that E-kids were appropriating Asian popular culture such as anime and Korean pop, the counterculture grew in popularity driven by retailers such as Hot Topic and also due to mainstream exposure of emo pop.

Hip hop

For Black American and Black British youth, hip hop fashion became more politicized. This was due to the influence of social justice rappers including Stormzy, No Name, the Black Lives Matter movement, and a resurgence of interest in past civil rights organizations such as the Black Panther Party. Slogan T-shirts inspired by punk fashion, black leather jackets or trench coats, hoodies, black sweatpants, face-concealing black bandanas, dark glasses, marijuana motifs, skull masks, morale patches, paramilitary tactical vests, and camouflage patterns were popular. Black American activists in the South sometimes wore blue union army kepis at the demolition of Confederate statues to taunt lost cause revisionists and white supremacists.

Thanks to American artists like Ken Carson, Playboi Carti, and Lil Uzi Vert, the 2020s are particularly famous for a new generation of streetwear ensembles that are "vamp" influenced. Heavy metal-inspired hip-hop apparel, dyed dread locs or braids, occult decorations like pentagrams and upside-down crosses, and layering garments are essential elements of this punk-inspired hip-hop trend.

Soft Grunge, VSCO girls, and Kid core 

American indie fashion of the early 2020s had a significant crossover with the Japanese subculture Kid-Core, where the two terms became interchangeable in the US. The indie kid look centers around bright colors and nods to the late 1990s and 2000s. Thrifting was widespread across the internet in 2020 due to Gen Z's distaste for fast fashion and a desire to emulate the past. American and European teens started flooding thrift stores like Goodwill in hopes of finding trendy items such as wide-legged jeans, oversized zip-up hoodies, striped cardigans, crop tops, collared shirts, shoestring belts, mom jeans and other high-rise pants, shortalls, bucket hats, Doc Martens, platform shoes, shredded denim, flower crowns, and tennis skirts. People who influenced this trend include indie rapper Russ and Australian rapper the Kid Laroi.

Unlike the hipster subculture of the 2010s, American indie kids of the 2020s favored a more childlike style that took inspiration from the late 1990s and 2000s, bedroom pop, skater fashion, energy drink culture, and hyper pop. Though the indie movement attempted to be anti-conformist and environmentally friendly, this trend was heavily criticized by young people reselling cheap second-hand clothing at inflated prices.

A subsection of indie fashion was the VSCO girls who tried to emulate the style of the photo app, VSCO. These girls wear scrunchies on their wrists and in their hair with high-side ponytails and headbands. Footwear includes white sneakers, ballet flats, and sandals. VSCO girls do not wear loud colors. They wear little to no makeup that blends with their skin and prioritizes a cute and comfortable style. The style also included elements of soft grunge such as pastel pinks and blues, high waisted pants, oversized tie dye T-shirts, long sweatshirts or sweater dresses, bike shorts, Nike track shorts, Nike Tempo shorts, capri and ankle length leggings with socks, T-shirt dresses, denim skirts, overalls, shortalls, high waisted mom jeans many times with shirts, sweaters, sweatshirts tucked in their jeans and a belt worn, headbands, and Nike Elite socks in many different colours.

Indie Sleaze

In contrast to the brightly colored, childlike outfits popular in America, and the mismatched clothing previously worn ironically by hipsters during the 2010s, British indie pop fans favored a darker, more authentic post-punk and garage rock-inspired aesthetic. Critics have compared the early 2020s indie rock revival, with its 1960s- and Noughties-inspired outfits, to the original British Invasion. Members of the UK indie subculture combined thrifted dress clothing from the mid 2000s to early 2010s with carefully selected vintage clothing, and new garments made to retro 1960s patterns by companies such as Madcap England. Artists including Sam Fender, Wet Leg, Lathums, Years & Years, and Wolf Alice popularized velvet or paisley tuxedo jackets in dark blue, green or burgundy, off the peg dark wash slim fit jeans (but not as tight as those of the 2010s), striped polo shirts with cardigan sweater styling, white T shirts, black leather jackets, bucket hats, plaid or black miniskirts (for girls), dresses with red or black polka dots, blouses especially in orange or brown, Argyle golfing sweaters, black or grey Prince of Wales check sport-coats, checked western shirts, ripped jeans, red Doc Martens, suede beatle boots with pointed toes, bowling shoes, brothel creepers, and parkas.

Dark and light academia

The dark academia aesthetic, which combined elements of preppy and gothic fashion, was heavily influenced by 1930s and 1940s fashion, particularly attire worn by students at Oxbridge, Ivy League colleges, and prep schools during the time.

Cardigans, blazers, dress shirts, plaid skirts, tights, knee socks, Oxford shoes, ballet flats, white sneakers, twill jogger pants, and apparel made of houndstooth and tweed are some of the most identified articles of clothing with the dark academia aesthetic. The typical color palette consisted primarily of black, white, beige, browns, dark green, and occasional navy. The style has been criticized for its having themes of Eurocentrism and unhealthy learning practices.

A closely related style, known as "light academia", was characterized by neutral and light colors, including soft blues, pinks, whites, creamy yellows, beige, light greys, light purple, pastel and dusty colors, plaid, stripes, and argyle patterns reminiscent of the preppy look of the early 1980s. Variants to this style, which originated in America as an internet trend, included "pastel academia," "romantic academia," and "chaotic academia." Unlike dark academia, light academia is about positivity, self-care, and the warm and pleasurable parts of life. Clothing items included pleated skirts, skater dresses, jumper dresses, dresses worn with a belt, sweaters, cardigans, oversized tops, khaki pants, plaid pants, twill jogger pants, argyle, and pastel knee socks, argyle and pastel tights, black tights when worn with lighter colored clothes, socks slouched in summer weather, socks over tights, ankle and capri leggings, bike shorts, mom jeans and other high waisted pants, shortalls, shorts and skirts worn with tucked in dress shirts, cardigan sweaters and sweatshirts, turtlenecks, polo style shirts, and dressy shorts. Shoes included ballet flats, boat shoes, Mary Jane flats, white sneakers such as Keds or Sperry Top-Siders, flat ankle boots, and loafers. They are accessorized with headbands, scrunchies, watches, and thin bangles.

Goblin core, Fairy Grunge, and Coquette 
Goblincore, also known as gremlincore, is an American subculture and style of art based on the enjoyment of features of nature that were not conventionally considered beautiful. The Goblin was an evil thieving creature in European mythology, but it also served as a carefree expression of infatuation with nature's ugliness. Animals like frogs, snails, and materials like moss, dirt, plants, and fungi like mushrooms were associated with goblin core.

Goblin core was popular in the LGBTQ+ community. Attire could include adventure-ready gear — most goblin core fans appear to prefer ensembles with multiple clashing patterns/colors, especially oversized sweaters — or worn-out or customized pants and overalls. Much of the apparel is worn-out, thrift, or second-hand for a more relaxed vibe, similar to the look of crust punks in the late 1990s. Most goblincore enthusiasts preferred getting dirty, so keeping their clothes clean was not a priority.

Fairy grunge combined the aesthetics of fairy-core, coquette, and grunge. Social media creators were mostly responsible for popularizing this aesthetic. Fairy grunge might be seen as a natural extension of the kinderwhore style — which has deep roots in grunge — but with a more ethereal touch. Fairy grunge often included oversized t-shirts or hoodies, long or mini skirts, nightgowns, corsets, mittens, gloves, skull patterns, mesh tights or fishnets, high knee socks, leg warmers, platform Demonia shoes, fairy wings, and sometimes elf ears. Coquette, also sometimes referred to as Nymphet, has been criticized for the glamorization of eating disorders, pedophilia, racism, and classism.

Bimbocore, McBling, and Gyaru 
Bimbocore, also known as Barbiecore, is an American and Canadian feminist fashion subculture that reclaims the sexist stereotypes of American starlets from the 2000s. Bleached blonde hair, Juicy Couture. Von Dutch, Ed Hardy, skimpy skintight clothing, and McBling-inspired fashion accessories characterize Bimbocore. A visually similar Japanese subculture, known as Gyaru, dates back to the late 1990s. The style acts as a meta-ironic parody of the mid-2000s to early 2010s Millennial Girlboss Feminism, acknowledging that they are appealing to heteronormative feminine beauty standards, but in a queer feminist way. Pro-sex work and pro-women's rights, Bimbocore gained popularity in leftist TikTok communities. McBling was commonly mislabeled as Y2K. Millennial pink, Rhinestones, small handbags, large sunglasses, and pop music define this aesthetic.

Bimbocore was criticized for glamorizing the sugar baby lifestyle and adult platforms such as OnlyFans, but that did not end the movement's popularity with Gen Z. Mcbling has also been thoroughly criticized for racism, whitewashing, classism, and fatphobia.

Gorpcore 

Gorpcore is a style that emerged in the late 2010s/early 2020s, coined by Jason Chef in 2017.  Gorpcore incorporates tech-based, loose-fitting outdoors and "camping-chic" inspired style. It has developed into a style classification within the past couple of years. Like other style and fashion trends, people who adhere to or insert the style in their lives reuse and incorporate style inspiration from previous style generations or similar "outdoorsy" styles. The style is somewhat open for interpretation because it is fairly new, making it flexible and creative, although certain patterns and forms often help classify an outfit as "Gorp." 
 
Brands associated with Gorpcore aesthetic include Arc'teryx, Patagonia, The North Face, and more. The trend is considered by many to be elitist, and often the brands associated are premium brands with high price tags out of range for average wage earners, similar to how high-end fashion brands exclude the average person.

A significant part of this style category is defined by the earthy and muted tones often found in the range of gear included in the trend, such as olive green, khaki, beige grey marl, and horizon blue.

Additionally, the types of apparel pieces that usually make up the trend include down jackets, body warmers, anoraks, utilitarian Eagle Creek and Osprey rucksacks, crew neck and v neck t shirts with zip pockets, utility pants, moisture-wicking "trekking shirts" with short sleeves and snap fasteners, knit caps, big headphones and racer-glasses.

The fashion style attempts to align with the desire for sustainable fashion, and often relevant clothing element pieces can be found in vintage, second-hand, or thrift shops. Additionally, designer pieces that fit the mode can be found in e-commerce stores like Depop or Thred-up.

The style is unisex, reflecting how people search for new ways to incorporate previously underutilized categories of utilitarian outdoor activity-related clothing into modern urban settings.

Hairstyles

Women's Hairstyles (2020-2023) 

Due to the restrictions on hair salons during the lockdowns, many women grew out their hair or watched tutorials to do their own hair. Popular styles included curtain bangs, 1980s, 1990s and early 2000s-inspired bangs, hair extensions, ponytails, twin Pigtail, French braid, shaggy hair commonly known as the "wolf cut", and natural hair for Black American women. Along with these hairstyles, 1960s-inspired beehive hairdos were popularized by British pop singers Emily Capell and Joy Crookes, and early 2000s fashion-inspired straightened and brightly dyed hair was made popular by Doja Cat and Billie Eilish from 2021–22.

Common hair accessories included pearl and sequin hair clips, headbands, bandannas and scrunchies. During the lockdowns of 2020–21, some women in the UK, America, and Asia experimented with DIY hairstyles at home, including the bob cut, the crop, the partially shaved head, bangs, and the pixie cut.

Men's Hairstyles (2020-2023)

Beginning in 2020, full beards associated with hipster subculture declined, except in parts of the Middle East, Africa, Eastern Europe, and Latin America. When worn, beards in the West have generally trimmed short to accentuate the wearer's features and facilitate masking.

Hairstyles of the late 1980s, 1990s and early to mid 2000s such as side parted or centrally parted curtained hair, permed hair, bleached hair, the "Wet Mop"," Mullets (especially in America and Australia), quiffs, the "Edgar cut", and shaggy hair came back among teenagers and young adult men due to barbershop closures in the UK and US. Many younger Black American men opted for natural hair from 2021 onwards, especially the skin fade, textured Caesar cut and short versions of the afro or dreadlocks combined with an undercut. Meanwhile, many balding men in the UK, America, and Ireland continued to get buzz cuts at home during the lockdown. Despite negative online reactions by heterosexual women, young males began growing mustaches in the summer of 2022, inspired by Miles Teller's role in Top Gun: Maverick.

Cosmetics trends

Skincare
Common skincare techniques in America during the early 2020s included "slugging" the face and sometimes the hair with petroleum jelly. Many Indian and American women also used vitamin C and Retinol serums in the form of a liquid, cream or gel to reduce fine lines, improve collagen production, reduce blemishes, and address pigmentation issues.

In April 2021, influencers on TikTok popularized Gua sha, a Chinese skincare technique that uses face stones to promote blood and energy flow. Another Asian technique, using rice water as a hair treatment, simultaneously gained popularity in the West. Baby botox was injected into the foreheads of young women to prevent wrinkles.

Makeup
The Clean Girl look evolved from the previous decade's Model Off Duty aesthetic. The term was coined during the early 2020s to characterize the makeup style pioneered by American models like Bella Hadid and Lily Rose Depp. This casual monochromatic tone style had matching clothing sets that complemented the cosmetics, button-down shirts, slicked-back hair, fluffy brows, dewy skin, flushed cheeks, and glossy lips. Clean Girl was focused on appearing effortlessly flawless and casual, adapting all the fashion trends from the early 2020s and giving them a muted tonal color palette and a sexy, carefree attitude. The strong emphasis on skincare, diet, and exercise made the clean girl not only a fashion statement but a lifestyle as well, similar to her 1960s predecessor. The Clean Girl aesthetic has been criticized for cultural appropriation, toxic positivity, and fatphobia, which did affect its mainstream popularity.

The maximalist graphic eyeliner trend of 2022 allowed British and American women to emphasize their eyes with vibrant colors and geometric designs. Graphic eyeliner made headlines and introduced women to new methods to experiment with facial makeup.

Tattoos
From 2021 onwards, new tattoo styles emerged among younger trendsetters. Popular trends for women included colorful modern reinterpretations of traditional Japanese tattoos, psychedelic art, tramp stamps, minimalist black and white portraits, lightning bolts, fine art, pop culture mashups, holograms, and dot work.

Other popular tattoo designs included spiritual meanings such as representations of the Buddha, Hindu mandalas, and the Tree of Life. Tribal tattoos and hyperrealistic portraits of loved ones popular during the 2010s declined.

Plastic surgery 
The Brazilian butt lift is a gluteal fat grafting procedure that utilizes excess fat collected from other body areas to add buttock volume and projection or adjust overall shape and symmetry. The Brazilian Butt lift reached its peak media coverage in 2021, when it was declared to be "the world's most dangerous cosmetic surgery", with news headlines discussing the procedure's risks and fatalities following the procedure. The "fox eye lift" in particular, was a contentious cosmetic trend because of the strong racial connotations associated with giving someone an oriental eye shape.

Changing body standards 
It was "no longer fashionable to be curvaceous," according to mainstream news outlets of the day; Heroin Chic enjoyed a popular resurgence. Eating disorders and toxic beauty standards became a problem for all genders due to manospheric obsession towards low body fat and sharp angular faces, leading to severe body dysmorphic disorders, the glorification of cosmetic jaw surgery and eating disorders in those who identify as men. Fat shaming spread to main stream platforms such as TikTok and Instagram, and Twitter users engaged in targeted harassment of those who did not fit their ideal beauty standards. A woman could be targeted for harassment simply by being present online.

Exhibitions

2020 

 "About Time: Fashion and Duration" October 26 until February 7, 2021 at the Costume Institute at the Metropolitan Museum of Art in New York City.

2021 

 In America: A Lexicon of Fashion at the Costume Institute at the Metropolitan Museum of Art in New York City

2022 

 “Fashioning Masculinities: The Art of Menswear" March 19 until November 6, 2022 at Victoria and Albert Museum in London
 "Africa Fashion" July 2 - April 16, 2023 at Victoria and Albert Museum in London

2023 

 "DIVA" June 2023 - ? at Victoria and Albert Museum in London

Gallery

See also

2020s
Impact of the COVID-19 pandemic on the fashion industry
2010s in fashion
2000s in fashion
History of Western fashion
Fashion design

External links 
Vogue
marie clarie
Nylon

References

 
2020s decade overviews